Kazhugumalai Kallan is a 1988 Indian Tamil-language action film directed by Rajasekhar. The film stars Charan Raj and Rekha. It was released on 23 March 1988.

Plot

Cast 
 Charan Raj
 Rekha
 Disco Shanti
 Radha Ravi
 Marthandan as Amavasa

Soundtrack 
The soundtrack was composed by Chandrabose, with lyrics by Vaali. This is the feature film debut for Prabhakar, a devotional singer.

Reception 
Jayamanmadhan of Kalki appreciated the film for being a return to form for director Rajasekhar after a long time. The Indian Express wrote, "The idea that was latent in the plot [...] is not exploited well by the director", adding, It's only Rekha [...] who puts some effort and feeling and some expression into her role.

References

External links 
 

1980s Tamil-language films
1988 action films
1988 films
Films directed by Rajasekhar (director)
Films scored by Chandrabose (composer)
Indian action films